Ümmügülsüm Sultan ("mother with rosed face" and "beloved rose" or "silver rose";  1677 - 9 May 1720), called also Ümmi Sultan or Gülsüm Sultan, was an Ottoman princess, the daughter of Sultan Mehmed IV, and his Haseki Emetullah Rabia Gülnuş Sultan. She was the sister of Sultans Mustafa II and Ahmed III.

Early life
Ümmügülsüm Sultan, called also Ümmi Sultan or Gülsüm Sultan, was born in 1677 circa as daughter of Mehmed IV and Emetullah Rabia Gülnuş Sultan. She had two brothers, Mustafa II and Ahmed III, and three sisters, Hatice Sultan, Ayşe Sultan and Fatma Emetullah Sultan.

Marriage
Her father was deposed in 1687, and so was unable to arrange a marriage for her. And so her uncle who loved her very much, Sultan Ahmed II arranged her marriage to Silahdar Çerkes Osman Pasha. The wedding took place on 15 December 1693 in the Edirne Palace. Her dowry was fixed to 600,000 kuruş. The wedding was also attended by Sultan Ahmed's consort Rabia Sultan. The couple were given Sinan Pasha Palace as their residence. The two together had three daughters, Mihrişah Hanımsultan, Hatice Hanımsultan and Fatma Hanımsultan.

Her daughter Hatice Hanımsultan died in 1698, her other daughter Mihrişah Hanımsultan died in 1701 they both were buried in New Mosque. Only Fatma survived after infancy.

Death
Ümmügülsüm Sultan died on 9 May 1720 of smallpox, before her forty birthday, and was buried in the mausoleum of her grandmother at Mausoleum of Turhan Sultan, New Mosque, Istanbul, Turkey.

See also
 List of Ottoman princesses

Ancestry

References

Sources

1700 deaths
Royalty from Istanbul
17th-century Ottoman princesses